Hell Is a City is a 1960 British crime thriller film based on the 1954 novel of the same title by Maurice Procter. Written and directed by Val Guest, it was made by British studio Hammer Film Productions and filmed in Manchester. It was partly inspired by the British New Wave films and resembles American Film Noir.

Plot
Committed but seen-it-all police inspector Martineau rightly guesses that after a violent jailbreak a local criminal will head home to Manchester to pick up the spoils from his last job. Martineau is soon investigating a murder during a street robbery which seems to lead back to the same villain. Concentrating on the case and using his local contacts to try to track the gang down, he is aware he is not keeping his own personal life together as well as he might.

Cast
 Stanley Baker as Inspector Harry Martineau
 John Crawford as Don Starling
 Donald Pleasence as Gus Hawkins
 Maxine Audley as Julia Martineau
 Billie Whitelaw as Chloe Hawkins
 Joseph Tomelty as Furnisher Steele
 George A. Cooper as Doug Savage
 Geoffrey Frederick as Detective Devery
 Vanda Godsell as Lucky Luske
 Charles Houston as Clogger Roach
 Joby Blanshard as Tawny Jakes
 Charles Morgan as Laurie Lovett
 Peter Madden as Bert Darwin
 Dickie Owen as Bragg
 Lois Daine as Cecily Wainwright
 Warren Mitchell as Commercial Traveller
 Sarah Branch as Silver Steele
 Alister Williamson as Sam
 Russell Napier as Superintendent
 Philip Bond as Headquarters PC (uncredited)
 John Comer as Plainclothes Police Driver (uncredited)
 John Harvey as Fingerprint Officer (uncredited)
 Doris Speed as Older Nursing Sister in Hospital (uncredited)

References

External links
 
 
 
 
 Levenshulme: Hell is a City File - website on the Manchester suburb, with a page dedicated to the film and book on which it is based

1960 films
British crime thriller films
1960s crime thriller films
Films shot at Associated British Studios
1960s English-language films
British black-and-white films
Hammer Film Productions films
Films based on British novels
Films set in Manchester
Films directed by Val Guest
Films shot at Bray Studios
Police detective films
Films shot in Greater Manchester
1960s British films